Kenneth Andersson may refer to:

 Kennet Andersson (born 1967), Swedish footballer
 Kenneth Andersson (tennis) (born 1945), Swedish tennis player